Myriopteris myriophylla, the Central American lace fern, is a species of lip fern. Despite its common name, this species is native as far south as Argentina. It is adapted to dry areas.

Taxonomy
In 1811, Nicaise Auguste Desvaux described two similar species, from Chile and South America respectively, which he named Cheilanthes elegans and Cheilanthes myriophylla.

The development of molecular phylogenetic methods showed that the traditional circumscription of Cheilanthes is polyphyletic. Convergent evolution in arid environments is thought to be responsible for widespread homoplasy in the morphological characters traditionally used to classify it and the segregate genera that have sometimes been recognized. On the basis of molecular evidence, Amanda Grusz and Michael D. Windham revived the genus Myriopteris in 2013 for a group of species formerly placed in Cheilanthes. One of these was C. myriophylla, which thus became M. myriophylla again. In 2018, Maarten J. M. Christenhusz transferred the species to Hemionitis as H. myriophylla as part of a program to consolidate the cheilanthoid ferns into that genus.

Further molecular studies in Myriopteris demonstrated the existence of three well-supported clades within the genus. M. myriophylla belongs to what Grusz et al. informally named the covillei clade. Members of the  "core covillei" clade, including M. myriophylla, have leaves finely divided into bead-like segments. Within this clade, M. myriophylla is part of a subclade including M. chipinquensis, M. jamaicensis, M. rufa, M. tomentosa, and M. windhamii, most of which are apogamous.

Notes and references

References

Works cited

External links 

myriophylla
Species described in 1811